John VI, Lord of Werle-Waren-Goldberg (born: after 1341; died: after 16 October 1385) was Lord of Werle-Goldberg from 1382 to 1385.

He was the son of Bernard II of Werle and Elizabeth, daughter of John III, Count of Holstein-Plön.

He reigned only along with his father and after his father's death in 1382 alone, over the Lordships of Werle-Goldberg and Werle-Waren.  He was married with Agnes, daughter of  Nicholas IV of Werle-Goldberg.  It is not known when he died.  In a document dated 16 October 1395, he is mentioned as being alive.  He is known to have died before 1395.

Children 
 Nicholas V, Lord of Werle-Waren-Goldberg
 Christopher, Lord of Werle-Waren-Goldberg
 Agnes, a nun at Malchow, (died after 21 October 1449)
 Mirislava, (died after 28 November 1436)

External links 
 Genealogical table of the House of Mecklenburg
 Biographical information about John at emecklenburg.de

Lords of Werle
14th-century births
14th-century deaths
14th-century German nobility
Year of birth uncertain
Year of death uncertain